Kouassi Ryan Sessegnon (born 18 May 2000) is an English professional footballer who plays as a left-back or left winger for Premier League club Tottenham Hotspur.

Sessegnon made his breakthrough in the Fulham senior side in 2016, aged 16. He made an instant impact, becoming the first footballer born in the 2000s to score a goal in a first-team game in the professional English leagues, and the youngest player to score in a Championship match. In 2017–18, his second season, Sessegnon helped Fulham achieve promotion to the Premier League via the play-offs, scoring fifteen goals and winning numerous personal awards. He totalled 120 games and 25 goals for Fulham, before joining Tottenham for a £25 million fee in 2019.

Early life and career
Sessegnon was born in Roehampton, Greater London into a family of Beninese descent. He has a twin brother, Steven, who plays for Charlton Athletic on loan from Fulham, while their elder brother, Chris, is a semi-professional footballer. Sessegnon is also a cousin of the Beninese international footballer Stéphane Sessègnon.

As a child, Sessegnon, alongside brother Steven, played for local club Wandgas FC. In 2008, at the age of nine, the pair signed for Fulham, initially joining their under-9s side. Originally a central striker at youth level, he was moved to left back as he progressed. He has cited fellow left-sided players Luke Shaw and Gareth Bale as players he looked up to when he was young, saying, 'when Shaw was at Southampton he was a left-back and I loved watching him bomb up and down the wing, create goals, score goals, so I think I try to emulate that.'

Sessegnon attended Coombe Boys' School in New Malden, London, close to Fulham's Motspur Park training ground. With both brothers in the team, Coombe Boys won youth competition the ESFA PlayStation Schools' Cup in both 2014 and 2015, Ryan scoring twice in the 2015 final. By the 2015–16 season, Sessegnon had become a regular for Fulham's Under-18 side, despite only being 15.

Club career

Fulham

2016–17 season
Having started training with the first team, still aged 15, in March 2016, Sessegnon was promoted to the senior squad by manager of the year Slavisa Jokanovic for the 2016–17 pre-season. He scored his first senior goal on 19 July in a 3–0 friendly win over Brighton and Hove Albion.

On 9 August, Sessegnon made his first-team debut in an EFL Cup match against Leyton Orient aged 16 years and 81 days. On 16 August, he made his league debut in a Championship match against Leeds United in a 1–1 draw. On 20 August, he scored his first professional goal in a league match against Cardiff City, becoming the first professional footballer in the English leagues to have been born in the 2000s to score a goal in a first-team game and the youngest player to score in a Championship match. He scored the winner on his FA Cup debut, also against Cardiff, on 8 January, becoming one of the youngest goalscorers in the history of the competition.

On 11 March, Sessegnon scored twice in an away match against eventual league champions Newcastle United, with former Newcastle player Alan Shearer praising his performance as "brilliant". In total, Sessegnon made 30 appearances in all competitions, including in the second leg of Fulham's play-off semi-final defeat against Reading, scoring seven goals, and was named in the PFA Championship Team of the Year, the youngest player ever included.

Media interest in Sessegnon grew as his debut season progressed. In February 2017, Italian newspaper La Gazzetta dello Sport ranked Sessegnon as one of the top 30 Under-20s players in Europe, while in May 2017, Sports Illustrated named him as the 19th-best under-20 player in world football. Fulham striker Neeskens Kebano called him "the future of English football", with teammate Stefan Johansen saying it was "99% certain he will be one of the top left-backs in the world".

As the summer transfer window approached, interest was reported from numerous Premier League clubs, including Everton, Liverpool and Manchester United, with Sessegnon potentially available for a compensation fee of £2 million as Football Association rules meant he could not sign professional terms until his 17th birthday on 18 May 2017. However, on 28 June 2017, it was announced Sessegnon had signed his first professional contract with Fulham, committing him to the club until 2020. Sessegnon cited the likelihood of playing regularly in the first team as his reason, saying, "Last season I got a lot of opportunities so I want to continue that. When you are young you just want to play as many games as you can."

2017–18 season

On 28 July 2017, Fulham announced that Sessegnon would wear the number 3 shirt, moving from his previous number 30. He scored his first goal of the season in a 1–1 draw with Cardiff on 9 September. In November 2017, FourFourTwo included Sessegnon in their 100 Best Teenagers in the World list, comparing him with Ashley Cole and David Alaba. On 21 November 2017, Sessegnon marked his 50th appearance for Fulham by scoring his first professional hat-trick in a 5–4 away victory against Sheffield United – becoming the first seventeen-year-old to score a hat-trick in the top four tiers of English league football since Dele Alli in 2014. After netting six goals in January 2018, courtesy of braces against Ipswich Town, Burton Albion and Barnsley, Sessegnon was named PFA and Championship Player of the Month. On 19 February, Sessegnon was named tenth in the most promising under 20 prospects in the whole of Europe. Sessegnon featured in a prestigious list by CIES with the likes of Milan goalkeeper Gianluigi Donnarumma featuring in 1st place and Paris Saint-Germain striker Kylian Mbappé in 3rd place.

In April 2018 he was nominated for the EFL Championship Player of the Season and Young Player of the Season awards. He also became the first Championship player to be nominated for the PFA Young Player of the Year award. On 15 April, Sessegnon won an unprecedented five awards when he was named Championship Player of the Season, Young Player of the Season, Apprentice of the Year, and named in the Team of the Season and EFL Club Developed XI.

The signing of Matt Targett in the January transfer window was crucial as it allowed Sessegnon to play regularly as a left winger instead of a left back, where he was able to focus more on his extremely good anticipation and finishing instead of his weaker defensive side of the game.

Fulham finished the league season in third place, allowing them to advance to the play-offs, where Sessegnon helped his side secure a place in the play-off final by scoring the opening goal and assisting the game-winning goal in the semi-final second leg against Derby County. On 26 May, Sessegnon assisted Tom Cairney's 23rd-minute goal in a 1–0 win against Aston Villa in the Championship play-off final at Wembley to secure Fulham's promotion to the Premier League.

2018–19 season
Sessegnon made his first Premier League appearance on 11 August 2018, the opening day of the new league campaign, in a 2–0 home defeat to Crystal Palace. On 20 October, he scored his first Premier League goal in a 4–2 away loss to Cardiff City, becoming the first player born in the 2000s to score in the competition. He made his 100th appearance for the club on 8 December, starting in a 4–1 league loss to Manchester United.

On 2 April 2019, Fulham were relegated from the Premier League following a 4–1 defeat by Watford.

Tottenham Hotspur
On 8 August 2019,  Sessegnon signed for Tottenham Hotspur on a five-year-deal with an optional one-year extension. The deal was reported to be worth £25 million which also saw Josh Onomah go to Fulham. Due to injury Sessegnon did not make his debut for Tottenham until the beginning of November. He came on late into injury time in a match against Everton which ended 1–1. His Champions League debut came in the following match, as he came off of the bench against Red Star Belgrade and assisted a goal for Christian Eriksen. He had his first start in a Tottenham shirt in the Champions League away against Bayern Munich in December, where he scored his first goal for the club, becoming the youngest Spurs player to score in a Champions League game.

Sessegnon scored his first league goal for Tottenham in a 4–1 victory against Southampton on the opening day of the 2022–23 Premier League season. He would score the opener in a 3-2 win against Bournemouth F.C in which Spurs came back from two goals down.

1899 Hoffenheim (loan)
On 5 October 2020, Sessegnon joined 1899 Hoffenheim on a season-long loan deal. Hoffenheim fans voted him player of the month for November.

International career
In 2016, Sessegnon played up an age group to represent England in the U17 Euros. He scored his first goal for England Under-19s against Luxembourg in a European Under-19 Championship qualifier on 10 November 2016, scoring the second goal in a 2–0 win.

On 26 June 2017, Sessegnon was named in the final 18-man squad for the Euro U19s finals. He went on to score three goals, including two in a 4–1 win over Germany, finishing the tournament as joint-top scorer as England were crowned champions for the first time. He was subsequently included in the team of the tournament.

Aged 17, Sessegnon made his debut for England Under-21s on 27 March 2018, starting in a 2–1 European Under-21 Championship qualifier win over Ukraine.

On 27 May 2019, Sessegnon was included in England's 23-man squad for the 2019 UEFA European Under-21 Championship.

Guinness World Record
On 27 May 2019, Sessegnon achieved the Guinness World Records title for 'Fastest time to hit both football  goal posts and crossbar', doing so in just 7.75 seconds.

Career statistics

Honours
Fulham
EFL Championship play-offs: 2018

England U19
UEFA European Under-19 Championship: 2017

Individual
PFA Team of the Year: 2016–17 Championship, 2017–18 Championship
PFA Championship Player of the Month: January 2018
EFL Championship Player of the Month: January 2018
UEFA European Under-19 Championship Golden Boot: 2017
UEFA European Under-19 Championship Team of the Tournament: 2017
LFE Championship Apprentice of the Year: 2017–18
EFL Team of the Season: 2017–18

References

External links

Profile at the Tottenham Hotspur F.C. website

2000 births
Living people
English people of Beninese descent
English sportspeople of African descent
Twin sportspeople
English twins
Black British sportsmen
Footballers from Roehampton
English footballers
Association football defenders
Association football wingers
Fulham F.C. players
Tottenham Hotspur F.C. players
TSG 1899 Hoffenheim players
English Football League players
Premier League players
Bundesliga players
England youth international footballers
England under-21 international footballers
English expatriate footballers
Expatriate footballers in Germany
English expatriate sportspeople in Germany